The Gallant Legion is a 1948 American Western film directed by Joseph Kane and written by Gerald Drayson Adams. The film stars Wild Bill Elliott, Lorna Gray, Joseph Schildkraut, Bruce Cabot, Andy Devine and Jack Holt. The film was released on May 24, 1948, by Republic Pictures.

Plot

Cast   
Wild Bill Elliott as Gary Conway 
Lorna Gray as Connie Faulkner 
Joseph Schildkraut as Senator Clarke Faulkner
Bruce Cabot as Beau Laroux
Andy Devine as Windy Hornblower
Jack Holt as Captain Banner
Grant Withers as Wesley Hardin
Adele Mara as Catalina
James Brown as Tom Banner
Harold Landon as Chuck Conway
Tex Terry as Sergeant Clint Mason
Lester Sharpe as Matt Kirby
Hal Taliaferro as Billy Smith
Russell Hicks as Senator Beale
Herbert Rawlinson as Major Grant
Marshall Reed as Bowling
Steve Drake as Steve
Harry Woods as Lang

References

External links 
 

1948 films
American Western (genre) films
1948 Western (genre) films
Republic Pictures films
Films directed by Joseph Kane
American black-and-white films
1940s English-language films
1940s American films